Sternacanthus is a genus of beetles in the family Cerambycidae, containing the following species:

 Sternacanthus allstoni Bates, 1870
 Sternacanthus batesi Pascoe, 1862
 Sternacanthus picicornis Thomson, 1860
 Sternacanthus picticornis Pascoe, 1857
 Sternacanthus sexmaculatus Bates, 1870
 Sternacanthus undatus (Olivier, 1795)
 Sternacanthus unifasciatus Aurivillius, 1922

References

Trachyderini
Cerambycidae genera